Goldasht is a city in Isfahan Province, Iran.

Goldasht may also refer to:
Goldasht-e Olya, Fars Province
Goldasht-e Sofla, Fars Province
Goldasht, Gilan
Goldasht, Lorestan
Goldasht, Markazi
Goldasht, Mazandaran
Goldasht, Sistan and Baluchestan
Goldasht, Lamerd
Gol Dasht (disambiguation)